The Cream of Eric Clapton is a compilation DVD of live Eric Clapton performances.  It is not to be confused with the CD The Cream of Eric Clapton.

Personnel
Eric Clapton as himself
Jack Bruce as himself (archive footage)
Ginger Baker as himself (archive footage)
Tina Turner as herself
Phil Collins as himself

Track listing

The Yardbirds
1 "Louise" (Hooker)

Cream
2 "Cross Roads"  (Johnson, arr. Clapton)
3 "I Feel Free" (Bruce/Brown)
4 "Sunshine of Your Love" (Bruce/Brown/Clapton)
5 "Strange Brew" (Clapton/Pappalardi/Collins)
6 "White Room" (Bruce/Brown)

Solo
7 "Badge" (Clapton/Harrison)
8 "Worried Life Blues" (Merriweather)
9 "Layla" (Clapton/Gordon) 
10 "Knockin' On Heaven's Door" (Dylan)
11 "Cocaine" (Cale)
12 "I Shot the Sheriff" (Marley)
13 "Wonderful Tonight" (Clapton)
14 "Forever Man" (Williams)
15 "Tearing Us Apart"  (Clapton/Phillinganes)
16 "Behind the Mask" (Mosdell/Sakamoto/Jackson)
17 "Holy Mother" (Clapton/Bishop)

Track listing notes
 edited from both the Cream farewell concert and their Rock and Roll Hall of Fame induction.
 was not performed with Cream.
 edited from three different performances.
 performed as a duet with Tina Turner.
 performed with Mark Knopfler

Certifications

References

External links
 

Live video albums
1990 video albums
1990 live albums
1990s English-language films